Robert Seguso and Anders Järryd defeated Guy Forget and Yannick Noah for the 1987 French Open men's doubles title.

John Fitzgerald and Tomáš Šmíd were the defending champions, but lost in the first round to Arnaud Boetsch and Loïc Courteau, 7–6, 6–4.

Seeds

Draw

Finals

Top half

Section 1

Section 2

Bottom half

Section 3

Section 4

External links
 Association of Tennis Professionals (ATP) – main draw
1987 French Open – Men's draws and results at the International Tennis Federation

Men's Doubles
French Open by year – Men's doubles